Ishtamanu Pakshe is a 1980 Indian Malayalam film, directed by Balachandra Menon and produced by E. J. Peter. The film stars Sukumaran, Venu Nagavally, Ratheesh and Jagathy Sreekumar in the lead roles. The film has musical score by G. Devarajan.

Cast
 
Sukumaran 
Venu Nagavally 
Ratheesh 
Jagathy Sreekumar 
K. P. Ummer 
Sankaradi 
T. R. Omana 
Ambika 
Santhakumari

Soundtrack
The music was composed by G. Devarajan.

References

External links
  
 

1980 films
1980s Malayalam-language films
Films directed by Balachandra Menon